Esat Reshat Mala (born 18 October 1998) is an Albanian professional footballer who plays as a midfielder for Albanian club Vllaznia Shkodër.

Club career

Ballkani
Mala spent the first part of the 2017–18 season in the First Football League of Kosovo representing Ballkani. In the meantime, he also trained with Partizani B squad. He made 12 appearances and scored 8 goals, also giving 10 assists during his spell at the club K.F.C Ballkani.

Partizani Tirana
On 27 December 2017, Partizani Tirana announced the acquisition of Mala, on a two-and-a-half years contract. He made his competitive debut on 4 February 2018 by playing in the second half of a 2–1 home win over Kamza. He quickly won his place in the starting lineup under Sulejman Starova, winning the league's player of the month award in March. Mala finished the season with 17 league appearances, including one cup appearance, as Partizani finished 5th in the league. Following the end of the season, he was named as one of the talents of the season by the association Sporti na bashkon.

International career
On 28 May 2018. Mala made his debut with Albania U21 in a friendly match against Bosnia and Herzegovina U21 after being named in the starting line-up.

Career statistics

Honours

Individual
Albanian Superliga Player of the Month: March 2018
Albanian Superliga Talent of the Season: second place 2017–18

References

External links

Esat Mala at the Albanian Football Association

1998 births
Living people
People from Prizren
Albanian footballers
Albania under-21 international footballers
Albania international footballers
Albanian expatriate footballers
Albanian expatriate sportspeople in Turkey
Kosovan footballers
Kosovan expatriate footballers
Kosovan expatriate sportspeople in Albania
Kosovan expatriate sportspeople in Turkey
Association football midfielders
KF Ballkani players
Kategoria Superiore players
FK Partizani Tirana players